What Men Talk About. Simple Pleasures is an upcoming Russian comedy film directed by Mikhail Polyakov. It is scheduled to be theatrically released on February 2, 2023.

Plot 
Old friends meet to drink shamanic and talk about the personal. Aleksey tries to understand whether female friendship is real, Camille wonders if it is possible to fire the one you consider your best friend, Slava remembers his first love, and Alexander talks about the loss of his dad and the need to have fun, no matter what. Walking around the center of Moscow, they also discuss the problems of screwing in light bulbs and candid photos on social networks.

Cast 
 Rostislav Khait
 Leonid Barats
 Kamil Larin
 Aleksandr Demidov
 Mikhail Politseymako
 Maksim Vitorgan
 Garik Kharlamov
 Dmitry Nagiyev

References 

2023 films
2020s Russian-language films
Russian comedy films
Russian sequel films